This is a list of members of the Victorian Legislative Council from the elections of 10 September 1896 to the elections of 8 September 1898.

From 1889 there were fourteen Provinces and a total of 48 members.

Note the "Term in Office" refers to that members term(s) in the Council, not necessarily for that Province.

William Zeal was President of the Council, Frederick Brown was Chairman of Committees.

 Clarke died 15 May 1897; replaced by Rupert Clarke, sworn-in June 1897.
 Coutts died 3 May 1897; replaced by Thomas Comrie sworn-in June 1897.

References

 Re-member (a database of all Victorian MPs since 1851).

Members of the Parliament of Victoria by term
19th-century Australian politicians